Kili (Kilen, Kirin, Kila), known as Hezhe or more specifically Qileen in Chinese and also as the Kur-Urmi dialect of Nanai, is a Tungusic language of Russia and China. Nanai is a Southern Tungusic language, and Kili has traditionally been considered one of the diverse dialects of Nanai, but it "likely belongs to the northern group".

References

External links 
 ELAR archive of Endangered Tungusic Languages of Khabarovskij Kraj (including Kur-Urmi)

Languages of China
Languages of Russia
Severely endangered languages
Tungusic languages